Patrick Amoah (born 18 August 1986) is a Swedish footballer who plays as a defender for Segeltorp in the Swedish Fifth Division.

Club career

Djurgårdens IF and Assyriska FF (loan)
Amoah joined the Swedish Allsvenskan side Djurgårdens IF from the junior squad at the start of the 2004 Allsvenskan season and then joined Assyriska FF on loan in the 2006 Superettan season before returning to Djurgårdens IF after helping the club avoid relegation to the Division 1 2007 season.

CF Atlético Ciudad and Paris FC
Amoah then went on to play in Spain in 2007, signing with CF Atlético Ciudad for the 2007–08 Tercera División season before joining French side Paris FC for the 2008–09 Championnat National season.

White Star Woluwe
Amoah then signed for his first club in Belgium, White Star Woluwe, who were at the time playing in the Belgian Third Division. He helped the club gain promotion from the Third Division to the Belgian Second Division by scoring 35 goals in 46 games in the 2010–2011 Belgian Third Division season. This prolific strike rate earned him a move to newly 2011–12 Belgian Pro League season promoted side OH Leuven.

OH Leuven
Amoah joined Belgium Belgian Pro League side OH Leuven for the 2011–12 Belgian Pro League in August 2011. In his first official match for OHL, which was also the first match at the highest level of Belgian football for a team from Leuven in over 60 years, Amoah scored an injury time winner against Belgian giants Anderlecht. However, this proved to be his only goal for OHL as he appeared in six further games without scoring, eventually leading to his demotion to the substitute bench. Midway through the season, he transferred back to Woluwe.

Return to White Star Woluwe
Amoah returned to former club White Star Woluwe on the first day of 2012, 1 January, to help the club gain promotion from the 2011–12 Belgian Second Division to the 2012–2013 Belgian Pro League.

Fortuna Sittard
Amoah signed a two-year contract with the Dutch Jupiler League team Fortuna Sittard in 2013, but left the team already in 2014.

Back to Sweden
After half a year without a club, Amoah signed for Swedish third division team Huddinge in January 2015.

Personal life 
Amoah was born to a Finnish mother and Ghanaian father.

Honours 

 Djurgårdens IF
 Allsvenskan: 2005
 Svenska Cupen: 2004

References

External links
 Voetbal International profile 
 
 
 
 Amoah klar för Ciudad de Lorquí (2008–01–07) 

1986 births
Living people
People from Solna Municipality
Djurgårdens IF Fotboll players
Assyriska FF players
Swedish footballers
Swedish expatriate footballers
Sweden youth international footballers
Association football forwards
Expatriate footballers in Belgium
Expatriate footballers in France
Expatriate footballers in the Netherlands
Expatriate footballers in Spain
Paris FC players
RWS Bruxelles players
Oud-Heverlee Leuven players
Fortuna Sittard players
Huddinge IF players
Vasalunds IF players
Allsvenskan players
Superettan players
Ettan Fotboll players
Tercera División players
Championnat National players
Belgian Pro League players
Challenger Pro League players
Belgian Third Division players
Eerste Divisie players
Swedish people of Finnish descent
Swedish people of Ghanaian descent
Sportspeople from Stockholm County